Kathura is a large village in Sonipat district in Haryana state, India. The Headquarter of Kathura Barah and Akhil Bhartiya Narwal Khap is here.
.

Geography  
Kathura  is located at 29.086°N 76.582°E. Kathura has  26.70 km2 (10.30893sq mile) land area. It is the largest village of sonipat in area. It has an average elevation of 222 meters (728.346 feet).

History 
Before partition there are some Muslim also living happily and shared a great culture and brotherhood.

Evidences of Rajputana times pond is also found near Govt. Se. Sec. School.

Demographic 
As a block it contains 17 villages which had population of 72,709. Males constitute 54.33% of the population and females 45.67%. Area of Kathura Block is 205.01 square km. Location code or village code of Kathura(89) village is 059656. As per 2019 stats, Kathura village is also a gram panchayat.  Gohana is nearest town to Kathura.
Villages in Kathura Block are as Follows:

1.	Nizampur (1)
2.	Bhawar (2)
3.	Gharwal (3)
4.	Rindhana (4)
5.	Dhanana Aladadpur (5)
6.	Chhapra (6)
7.	Kahalpa (7)
8.	Bhanderi (8)
9.	Madina (9)
10.	Ahulana (10)
11.	Banwasa (13)
12.	Gudha(Part) (33)
13.	Thaska (34)
14.	Bhainswan Khurd (83)
15.	Mirzapur Kheri (87)
16.	Chhichhrana (88)
17.	Kathura (89)

Population  
There are 1787 families residing in Kathura village has population of 9639 of which 5190 are males while 4449 are females as per Population Census 2011. In Kathura village population of children with age 0-6 is 1180 which makes up 12.24% of total population of village. Schedule Caste (SC) constitutes 13.31% of total population in Kathura village. The village Kathura currently doesn't have any Schedule Tribe (ST) population.

Sex Ratio 
Average Sex Ratio of Kathura village is 857 which is lower than Haryana state average of 879. Child Sex Ratio for the Kathura as per census is 772, lower than Haryana average of 834.

Literacy rate 
Kathura village has higher literacy rate compared to Haryana. In 2011, literacy rate of Kathura village was 76.59% compared to 75.55% of Haryana. In Kathura Male literacy stands at 84.90% while female literacy rate was 67.04%.

Gotras 

 Narwal
 Vasisht
 Vats
 Gautam
 Jale (Jangra)

Notable people 

 
 Rajesh Narwal - Kabaddi player
 Sonu Narwal - Kabaddi player

Religious places 
 Shiv Temple (शिव मंदिर): It is believed to be the oldest temple of the village dedicated to lord Shiva.

 

 Hanuman Temple (हनुमान मंदिर): This is a new temple build recently. 

 Baba Madunath Aashram (बाबा माड़ुनाथ आश्रम):

 Baba Laxman Puri Dera (बाबा लक्ष्मण पुरी डेरा (मठ)):

 Kandi Mata Temple (कंडी माता):
 Dadi Sati Mandir (दादी सती मंदिर),Chapra road, Kathura
 Devi Mata mandir, Gora near Dhanana Road, Kathura
 Masani Mata Mandir Meham-Gohana Road, Kathura

Education  
Educational institutes in the village include.

 Govt. Sr. Sec. School
 Govt. Girls Sr. Sec. School
 I.T.I Kathura
 Kids Valley Convent School
 R P S Public School
 G D S Public school

Connectivity 

Both Public and Private Bus service are available within the village with a time interval of 15 minutes.

Nearby villages are Chiri(6.7 km), Dhanana(8.1 km), Chhapra(5.2 km), Kahlpa (3.5 km), Bhanderi(4.3 km), Katwara(6.9 km), Khidwali(10.1 km), Sanghi(7.5 km), Chhichhrana(6.1 km), Mirjapur Kheri(6.2 km)

Nearest towns are Gohana (13.2 km), Sonepat(50.2 km), Rohtak(26.9 km via Khidwali & Chmariya),Lakhan Majra(12.3 km), Meham(32.5 km) India Capital - Delhi(99 km via Gohana & Sonepat), State Capital - Chandigarh (221 km via Gohana & Panipat),

Nearest railway stations are Rukhi (11.7 km via Bhanderi and Chhicchhrana), Goahan (14.8 km), Lakahan Majra (13.4 km), Rohtak Junction (32.4 km via Lakhan majra), Sonepat Junction(50.1 km via Gohana)

Nearest airports are Indira Gandhi International Airport Delhi (101 km via Rohtak & Bhadurgarh), Chandigarh International Airport (217 km via Panipat).

References 

Villages in Sonipat district